The HP LaserJet 2400 series was a line of grayscale laser printers sold by Hewlett-Packard. The printer was aimed at small and medium business use. It was the successor to the  HP LaserJet 2300 series, and was in turn replaced by the HP LaserJet P3000 series.

Models
The HP LaserJet 2400 series consists of the following models:

 HP LaserJet 2410  
 HP LaserJet 2420
 HP LaserJet 2420n
 HP LaserJet 2420d
 HP LaserJet 2420dn
 HP LaserJet 2430t
 HP LaserJet 2430tn
 HP LaserJet 2430dtn

The letters at the end of the model have the following meaning:
 d - this model comes with an automatic duplexer
 t - this model comes with an additional tray
 n - this model comes with an internal 10/100 Ethernet JetDirect card
Models that have multiple letters will have all the options for those letters. For example the LaserJet 2430dtn has a duplexer, and extra tray and an internal 10/100 Ethernet JetDirect card.

Print speed
 2410 : up to 25 ppm (letter) / 24 ppm (A4)
 2420 : up to 30 ppm (letter) / 28 ppm (A4)
 2430 : up to 35 ppm (letter) / 33 ppm (A4)

See also
 List of Hewlett-Packard products

External links
 LaserJet 2400 manuals, Hewlett Packard support website

2400 series